Heliothela atra is a moth of the family Crambidae. It was described by Arthur Gardiner Butler in 1877, using a specimen obtained in the Canterbury plains and sourced from the collection of J. D. Enys. It is endemic in New Zealand. The habitat of this species is dry tussock grasslands.

References

Moths described in 1887
Heliothelini
Moths of New Zealand
Endemic fauna of New Zealand
Taxa named by Arthur Gardiner Butler
Endemic moths of New Zealand